Artúr Balthazár Coray (16 July 1881 in Budapest – 27 February 1909 in Muralto) was a Hungarian track and field athlete who competed at the 1900 Summer Olympics in Paris, France.

Coray competed in the shot put event. He placed seventh with a best throw of 11.13 metres. In the discus throw competition, Coray placed eleventh with a best throw of 31.00 metres.

He gave up sports in 1905 due to pulmonary disease and died in 1909.

References

External links

 De Wael, Herman. Herman's Full Olympians: "Athletics 1900". Accessed 18 March 2006.
 

1881 births
1909 deaths
People from Muralto
Hungarian male shot putters
Hungarian male discus throwers
Olympic athletes of Hungary
Athletes (track and field) at the 1900 Summer Olympics
Athletes from Budapest